Walter James Flower Phipps (31 January 1908 – c. 1987) was a rugby union player who represented Australia.

Phipps, a hooker, was born in Moss Vale, New South Wales and claimed 1 international rugby cap for Australia.

References

Australian rugby union players
Australia international rugby union players
People educated at Sydney Grammar School
1908 births
1987 deaths
Rugby union players from New South Wales
Rugby union hookers